Ormetica underwoodi is a moth of the family Erebidae. It was described by Walter Rothschild in 1909. It is found in Costa Rica.

References

Ormetica
Moths described in 1909